Miju may refer to:

Miju language
Miju Mishmi tribe